Chiara Gamberale (Rome, 27 April 1977) is an Italian writer,  television and radio presenter.

Biography 

Chiara Gamberale was born in Rome, April 27th, 1977. Her mother is an accountant and her father is Vito Gamberale. 

Gamberale graduated in Drama, Art and Music Studies (DAMS) at the University of Bologna.

In 1999, she published her first novel, Una vita sottile and in 1996, she won the young critics award Grinzane Cavour promoted by La Repubblica. In 2002, she began working as a television presenter, when Mariano Sabatini asked her to co-host Parola mia on Rai 3 alongside Luciano Rispoli. Subsequently, she hosted Quarto Piano Scala A Destra, as well as the cultural program Duende on the Lombard station Seimilano, and Io, Chiara e l'Oscuro on Rai Radio 2. She actively collaborates with the newspaper La Stampa and the Italian magazines Vanity Fair, Donna Moderna and IO donna. Her book Una passione sinistra was used to develop the movie Passione sinistra by Marco Ponti. In 2008, she was a finalist for the Campiello Prize with her book La zona cieca.

In 2009, she married Emanuele Trevi, an Italian literary critic, writer and editor-in-chief. They divorced in 2011. In 2017, she had a daughter, named Vita, from a new partner Gianluca Foglia, the editorial director of the Italian publisher Feltrinelli.

List of works 
 Una vita sottile, Venezia, Marsilio, 1999; Milano, Fabbri, 2004
 Color lucciola, Venezia, Marsilio, 2001
 Arrivano i pagliacci, Milano, Mondadori, 2014
 La zona cieca, Milano, Feltrinelli, 2017
 Una passione sinistra, Milano, Corriere della sera, 2008; Milano, Bompiani, 2009
 Le luci nelle case degli altri, Milano, Mondadori, 2010
 L'amore quando c'era, Milano, Corriere della sera, 2011
 Quattro etti d'amore, grazie, Milano, Mondadori, 2014
 Per dieci minuti, Milano, Feltrinelli, 2013
 Avrò cura di te, di Chiara Gamberale e Massimo Gramellini, Longanesi, Milano, 2014
 Adesso, Milano, Feltrinelli, 2016
 Qualcosa, scritto da Chiara Gamberale e illustrato da Tuono Pettinato, ed. Longanesi, 2017
 L' isola dell'abbandono, Milano, Feltrinelli, 2019

References

University of Bologna alumni
20th-century Italian women writers
1977 births
Living people
21st-century Italian women writers
Italian women novelists
Writers from Rome
Italian radio presenters
Italian television presenters
Italian women radio presenters
Italian women television presenters